Duy is a Vietnamese given name. Notable people with the name include:

 Đái Duy Ban (born 1937), Vietnamese scientist
 Đào Duy Từ (1572–1634), Vietnamese poet
 Duy Tân (1899–1945), Emperor of Vietnam
 Phạm Duy (1921–2013), Vietnamese songwriter
 Tống Duy Tân (died 1892), Vietnamese revolutionary
 Nguyễn Phong Hồng Duy (born 1996), Vietnamese footballer

See also
 Lê Duy Loan
 Pipo Nguyen-duy

Masculine given names
Vietnamese names